Žarko Peševski (born 11 April 1991) is a Macedonian handball player for RK Eurofarm Pelister and the North Macedonia national team.

References

External links

1991 births
Living people
Macedonian male handball players
Sportspeople from Skopje
Expatriate handball players
Macedonian expatriate sportspeople in Germany
Macedonian expatriate sportspeople in Ukraine
HC Motor Zaporizhia players
Handball-Bundesliga players